Tom DeSanto (born January 1, 1968) is an American film producer and screenwriter.

Career
DeSanto is a founding writer/producer behind several of the biggest franchises in movie history (X-Men, Transformers). DeSanto's films have grossed more than $5 billion worldwide with a per film average of more than $746 million at the box office, in addition to billions more in home video, merchandising, and video games.

After the success of X-Men, DeSanto began working on a reboot of Battlestar Galactica to developed for Universal Television. The show eventually returned in 2003 but under the direction of Ronald D. Moore.

DeSanto then become part of the creative team for X2: X-Men United, including the continuation of the Phoenix story line which DeSanto set up in the first film. That same year, he went moved towards  Transformers, another dormant property that he was a fan of since childhood. DeSanto brought the idea to his friend, and fellow producer Don Murphy. Based on DeSanto's pitch and understanding of the universe, Hasbro gave them the rights for free.

Transformers was a tough sell for the studios heads who hadn't grown up with the show. After being rejected by the major studios DeSanto made a second pass at DreamWorks, after Steven Spielberg read his treatment, he decided his studio would do the film and was an early champion of the idea. DeSanto set the project up with DreamWorks and Paramount, selling his story line and attaching to produce.

The first film grossed over $700 million worldwide and DeSanto gave birth to another franchise. Transformers was the first live-action franchise for DreamWorks and Paramount's largest moneymaking series in its history. DeSanto returned as producer of Revenge of the Fallen in 2009 and the film became the biggest moneymaker of the year with over $800 million in box office alone. DeSanto also produced Dark of the Moon, and Age of Extinction, both grossing over $1.1 billion worldwide. The Last Knight, produced by DeSanto as well, earned over $600 million in the box office.

After the Transformers saga had been released, DeSanto then produced Bumblebee, an origin story for one of the popular characters from the franchise earning a total $470 million in box office.

DeSanto has produced several social issue documentaries including Lost in America which deals with youth homelessness and Kidnapped for Christ which puts a spotlight on abusive evangelical camps for children.

Education
DeSanto was raised in the Iselin area of Woodbridge Township, New Jersey, the son of a police officer. He graduated from Bishop George Ahr High School in Edison, New Jersey in 1986 and from Rutgers University in 1990.

Work

Apt Pupil
During his first years in the film industry, Tom met and befriended Bryan Singer, who got Tom a production position with his company, Bad Hat Harry, working on his movie Apt Pupil, followed by a partnered attempt to revive Battlestar Galactica.

X-Men & X2
Later, Singer would co-write the movie X-Men with DeSanto and a few others before signing on as director, using most of DeSanto's original story.  DeSanto is credited for the screen story, as an executive producer, and for a short cameo role as the police officer on Ellis Island who is squashed by Toad.

Tom also worked as an executive producer on X2: X-Men United.

Transformers (Film Series)
Tom wrote the treatment for and produced the Transformers movie for DreamWorks and Paramount, which was released in Summer 2007. He is credited with being the originating producer on the project. This live-action version includes Steven Spielberg as an Executive Producer. He is also producer for the 2009 sequel, Transformers: Revenge of the Fallen, its 2011 sequel Transformers: Dark of the Moon, 2014 film Transformers: Age of Extinction , 2017 film Transformers: The Last Knight, 2018 film Bumblebee, 2023 film Transformers: Rise of the Beasts.

Other work
After leaving the X-Men film franchise, DeSanto has written several introductions to collected comics in both hardcover and trade paperback, including Superman: Red Son by Mark Millar, and Wolverine: Origin by Paul Jenkins. DeSanto also worked as a producer on the documentary film Ringers: Lord of the Fans released in 2005 by Sony Pictures Home Entertainment.

DeSanto was also involved in a Battlestar Galactica revival which fell through after the 9/11 attacks and scheduling delays forced Singer to concentrate on X2. Studios USA, wanting to push ahead with the series, replaced DeSanto and Singer with David Eick and Ronald D. Moore, who then created the "re-imagined" Battlestar Galactica.

In 2007 Variety reported that DeSanto, returning his attention to superheroes, secured the rights to NCsoft and Cryptic Studios' video game City of Heroes. The plan was to adapt the massively multiplayer online role-playing game into a live-action feature and then transition it to television in some form, but no further details have been heard.

In late 2007, he began production work as a writer and producer on Teen Titans: The Judas Contract, an animated cartoon based on the popular comic book, which was placed on indefinite hold by Warner Bros in February 2008.   In 2016, WB revealed the film would be moving forward at the premiere of the animated adaption of The Killing Joke and in 2016 the film was released, but without him involved.

In July 2016, the estate of Gary Gygax bestowed him with the title of "Guardian of the Library" placing him in charge of Gygax's work that was under the estate's control and finding a place on TV, Film and other mediums.

Filmography

References

Further reading

External links

1968 births
Film producers from New Jersey
American male screenwriters
Living people
St. Thomas Aquinas High School (New Jersey) alumni
People from Woodbridge Township, New Jersey
Writers from Elizabeth, New Jersey
Rutgers University alumni
Screenwriters from New Jersey